Rosselli is an Italian surname.

People
Notable people with the surname include:

Alfonso Patiño Rosselli (1923–1985), Colombian jurist and diplomat
Amelia Pincherle Rosselli (1870 – 1954), Italian writer
Amelia Rosselli (1930–1996), an Italian poet
Aurora M. Rosselli (born 1974), Italian-American artist and photographer
Bernardo di Stefano Rosselli (1450 - 1526), Italian painter
Carlo Rosselli (1899–1937), socialist Italian politician, journalist, historian, and brother of Nelllo Rosselli
Cosimo Rosselli (1439 – after 1506), Italian painter
Domenico Rosselli (c. 1439 – 1498), Italian sculptor
Elbio Rosselli, Uruguayan President of the United Nations Security Council
Francesco Rosselli (1445 – before 1513), Italian miniature painter
Francesco Rosselli (composer) (c.1510 – after 1577), French Renaissance composer
Giselle Rosselli, Australian singer-songwriter
Guido Rosselli (born 1983), Italian professional basketball player
Joe Rosselli (born 1972), American baseball player
Lou Rosselli (born 1970), former American wrestler
Luigi Rosselli, an Italian-born Australian architect
Mats Rosseli Olsen  (born 1991), Norwegian professional ice hockey
Matteo Rosselli (1578–1650), Italian painter
Nello Rosselli (1900–1937), socialist Italian politician and historian, and brother of Carlo Rosselli
Rex De Rosselli (1876–1941), American actor
Sal Rosselli (born 1949), American labor leader

Characters
Valentina Rosselli

See also 
Rosselli del Turco, historic noble family from Florence, Italy
Contarini-Rosselli map, first printed world map showing the New World
Rosselli-Gulienetti syndrome
Zoila rosselli, species of sea snail

Italian-language surnames